Chavan Bagh (also Romanized as Chavān Bāgh; also known as Chavān) is a village in Sarajuy-ye Shomali Rural District, in the Central District of Maragheh County, East Azerbaijan Province, Iran. At the 2006 census, its population was 776, in 160 families.

References 

Towns and villages in Maragheh County